Belovo is a town in South West Bulgaria. It is the seat of Belovo Municipality. It is located in Pazardzhik Province, where the Yadenitza flows into the Maritsa river, at the foot of three mountain ranges (Rila, Rhodopes and Sredna Gora), on the western end of the Thracian Plain.

Belovo town as a municipal center is surrounded by the villages of Akandzhievo, Gabrovitsa, Golyamo Belovo, Dabravite, Menekyovo, Momina Klisura and Sestrimo.

With the construction of the railway line Istanbul — Belovo by Baron Hirsch's company in 1873, Belovo become the most important center of wood and wood processing in the Balkans during the 18th century. Today the international road and the railway from West Europe through Belgrade and Sofia to Istanbul are passing through the town. The Belovo paper mill produces toilet paper and other disposable paper products.

International relations

Twin towns — Sister cities
Belovo is twinned with:

  Skotoussa, Greece
  Nevinnomyssk, Russia

References

Belovo municipality website

Towns in Bulgaria
Populated places in Pazardzhik Province